Ramón Martín Huerta (24 January 1957 – 21 September 2005) was a Mexican politician affiliated with the National Action Party (PAN). He served in Vicente Fox's cabinet as Public Security Secretary.

Personal life
Ramón Martín Huerta was born in San Juan de los Lagos, Jalisco on 24 January 1957. He studied business administration in the Universidad del Bajío. He was married to María Esther Montes Hernández with whom he had 3 children: Héctor Ramón, César Alejandro and Denisse.

Political career
During the 1980s he joined the PAN and became an active member. He was Director of Guanajuato's Industrials Association; there he met Vicente Fox and introduced him into politics.

From 1988 to 1991 he served in the lower house of the Mexican Congress. He was assigned personal secretary of former Governor Carlos Medina Plascencia. When Vicente Fox was elected Governor of Guanajuato he became a cabinet member and later, when Fox resigned in 1999 to run for the presidency, he was appointed substitute governor.

A trusted Fox ally and friend, Martín Huerta worked in the Secretary of the Interior from 2000 to 2004. In 2004 President Fox assigned Martín Huerta as Public Safety Secretary replacing former incumbent Alejandro Gertz Manero.

Helicopter crash
Ramón Martín Huerta, his deputy and seven others crashed in cloud-shrouded mountains outside Mexico City on Wednesday 21 September 2005 killing everyone on board. The craft, a Bell 412 helicopter, crashed into a wooded mountaintop about 11,200 feet (3700 m) high at a spot about 20 miles (30 km) outside Mexico City.

It has been speculated that the crash was caused by organized crime. However, authorities have always stated it was an accident.

References

1957 births
2005 deaths
Victims of helicopter accidents or incidents
National Action Party (Mexico) politicians
Governors of Guanajuato
Members of the Chamber of Deputies (Mexico)
Mexican Secretaries of Public Safety
Politicians from Jalisco
Victims of aviation accidents or incidents in Mexico
People from San Juan de los Lagos, Jalisco
20th-century Mexican politicians
21st-century Mexican politicians